Lucy Elizabeth Rogers  (born 1973) is a British author, inventor, and engineer. She is a visiting professor of engineering, creativity and communication at Brunel University London and has served as a judge on the BBC Two show Robot Wars from 2016 to 2018.

Education 

Rogers studied mechanical engineering at Lancaster University with an industrial placement year at Rolls-Royce Power Systems. She graduated with a Bachelor of Engineering degree. She stayed in Lancaster for her PhD which investigated how bubbles are formed in equipment used to fight petrochemical fires.

Career, research and public engagement
She attended NASA's Singularity University graduate studies program in 2011, where she co-authored a report on space debris.

In 2008 she published It's ONLY Rocket Science, a plain English guide to the mechanics of spaceflight.

Rogers hosts The DesignSpark Podcast with comedians Bec Hill and Harriet Braine.

In 2018, she founded the Guild of Makers to bring together makers from all disciplines and skill levels, which ran until 2020.

Awards and honours
Rogers is a Chartered Engineer (CEng) and was elected a Fellow of the Royal Academy of Engineering (FREng) in 2020. The Rooke Award committee highly commended Rogers for her efforts to promote engineering to the public. She is also a Fellow of the Institution of Mechanical Engineers (FIMechE).

in 2022, she won the "Women in Aerospace and Aviation Committee Award" from the Royal Aeronautical Society.

In 2019, she received an alumni award for "high-flying" Lancaster University graduates.

In 2013, she was shortlisted for the WISE Campaign award.

References 

Living people
BBC television presenters
Alumni of Lancaster University
Alumni of Fylde College, Lancaster
Fellows of the Royal Astronomical Society
Fellows of the Institution of Mechanical Engineers
British women engineers
British roboticists
Women roboticists
British inventors
British non-fiction writers
21st-century women engineers
Women inventors
English inventors
Fellows of the Royal Academy of Engineering
Female Fellows of the Royal Academy of Engineering
1973 births